Mark of the Renegade is a 1951 American Adventure Western film directed by Hugo Fregonese starring Ricardo Montalban and Cyd Charisse. The film is based on the novel Don Renegade by Johnston McCulley, and is set in Mexican-ruled Los Angeles in the 1820s.

Plot

In 1825, after fleeing a pirate ship, Marcos Zappa is taken to meet Don Pedro Garcia, whose ambition is to be emperor of California for the Republic of Mexico. Able to blackmail Marcos because of an "R" mark hidden beneath his bandanna permanently identifying Marcos as a renegade and traitor, Garcia schemes to have Marcos seduce and marry Manuella, the daughter of his rival, Jose de Marquez, having been rejected as a suitor himself.

Manuella is already engaged to be married to Miguel De Gandara. A gambling-house owner, Anita Gonzales, in league with Garcia, is angry when Marcos fails to succumb to her charms. Manuella is attracted to Marcos but not sure how much to trust him. He reveals the "R" brand as a demonstration of good faith. They spend a night together, whereupon her father insists they marry.

At the wedding, Miguel jealously challenges Marcos to a duel. Anita then exposes Marcos as a disloyal renegade, only to have it revealed that the "R" brand has been faked, with Marcos working undercover to unearth Garcia's treachery. In a sword fight, Marcos kills Garcia, then is free to marry Manuella.

Cast
 Ricardo Montalban as Marcos Zappa  
 Cyd Charisse as Manuella de Vasquez  
 J. Carrol Naish as Luis  
 Gilbert Roland as Don Pedro Garcia 
 Andrea King as Anita Gonzales  
 George Tobias as Captain Bardoso  
 Antonio Moreno as Jose De Vasquez  
 Georgia Backus as Duenna Concepcion  
 Robert Warwick as Colonel Vega  
 Armando Silvestre as Miguel De Gandara

References

Bibliography
 Blottner, Gene. Universal-International Westerns, 1947–1963: The Complete Filmography. McFarland, 2000.

External links
 
 
 

1951 films
American historical adventure films
1950s historical adventure films
Films set in the 1820s
Films set in Los Angeles
Films based on American novels
Films directed by Hugo Fregonese
Universal Pictures films
American swashbuckler films
1951 Western (genre) films
American Western (genre) films
Films scored by Frank Skinner
Films based on works by Johnston McCulley
1950s English-language films
1950s American films